The Abe-Star was a Japanese motorcycle built between 1951 and 1958. The top model was a 148cc four-stroke engine with the company's own overhead valve engine.

References

External links
 Photo

Motorcycle manufacturers of Japan